The Logical Investigations (1900–1901; second edition 1913) are a two-volume work by the philosopher Edmund Husserl, in which the author discusses the philosophy of logic and criticizes psychologism, the view that logic is based on psychology.

The work has been praised by philosophers for helping to discredit psychologism, Husserl's opposition to which has been attributed to the philosopher Gottlob Frege's criticism of his Philosophy of Arithmetic (1891). The Logical Investigations influenced philosophers such as Martin Heidegger and Emil Lask, and contributed to the development of phenomenology, continental philosophy, and structuralism. The Logical Investigations has been compared to the work of the philosophers Immanuel Kant and Wilhelm Dilthey, the latter of whom praised the work. However, the work has been criticized for its obscurity, and some commentators have maintained that Husserl inconsistently advanced a form of psychologism, despite Husserl's critique of psychologism. When Husserl later published Ideas (1913), he lost support from some followers who believed the work adopted a different philosophical position from that which Husserl had endorsed in the Logical Investigations. Husserl acknowledged in his manuscripts that the work suffered from shortcomings.

Summary

The Logical Investigations comprise two volumes. In the German editions, these are Volume I, "Prolegomena to Pure Logic" (Prolegomena zur reinen Logik), and Volume II, "Investigations in Phenomenology and Knowledge" (Untersuchungen zur Phänomenologie und Theorie der Erkenntnis).

In Volume I, Husserl writes that the Logical Investigations arose out of problems he encountered in attempting to achieve a "philosophical clarification of pure mathematics", which revealed to him shortcomings of logic as understood in his time. Husserl's "logical researches into formal arithmetic and the theory of manifolds" moved him beyond the study of mathematics and towards "a universal theory of formal deductive systems." He acknowledges that he had previously seen psychology as providing logic with "philosophical clarification", and explains his subsequent abandonment of that assumption. According to Husserl, logic "seeks to search into what pertains to genuine, valid science as such, what constitutes the Idea of Science, so as to be able to use the latter to measure the empirically given sciences as to their agreement with their Idea, the degree to which they approach it, and where they offend against it." He criticizes empiricism, and critiques psychologism, a position on the nature of logic according to which, the "essential theoretical foundations of logic lie in psychology"; Husserl criticizes the philosopher John Stuart Mill, taking his views on logic as an example of psychologism. He also discusses the views of the philosopher Immanuel Kant, as put forward in the Critique of Pure Reason (1781), as well as those of other philosophers, including Franz Brentano, Alexius Meinong, and Wilhelm Wundt.

In Volume II, Husserl discusses the relevance of linguistic analysis to logic and continues his criticism of Mill.

Publication history
The Logical Investigations was first published in two volumes in 1900 and 1901 by M. Niemeyer. Volume I of the second edition was first published in 1913, and Volume II of the second edition in 1921. In 1970, Routledge & Kegan Paul Ltd published an English translation by the philosopher John Niemeyer Findlay. In 2001, a new edition of Findlay's translation with a preface by the philosopher Michael Dummett and an introduction by the philosopher Dermot Moran was published by Routledge.

Reception

Husserl's assessment of the book
Husserl commented in Ideas that the Logical Investigations had led to phenomenology being mistakenly viewed as a branch of empirical psychology, despite his protests, in the article "Philosophy as Strict Science", that this was a misunderstanding of his work. Husserl's assessment of the Logical Investigations has been discussed in the Journal of Speculative Philosophy by Ullrich Melle; the journal also published Husserl's manuscript “On the Task and Historical Position of the Logical Investigations”.

Melle wrote that Husserl acknowledged in his manuscripts that the Logical Investigations suffered from shortcomings, which Husserl attributed to his initial failure to fully consider the proper sense and the full implications of their method and his lack of comprehension of how the work was related to both the history of philosophy and contemporary philosophy. According to Melle, Husserl was forced by concerns about his career to publish the Logical Investigations despite his awareness of these problems. He had not expected that the work would receive much attention, since it was allied with neither the trend to return to Kant nor the turn toward experimental psychology, and was surprised when it aroused considerable interest, something Husserl later attributed to its alignment with trends in philosophy, including one Melle summarized as a drive toward "an integration or synthesis of the legitimate motives" of both empiricism and rationalism. He noted that Husserl believed that most reactions to the work involved serious misunderstandings, for which Husserl believed that his use of the misleading term "descriptive psychology", which suggested a relapse into psychologism, was partly responsible. According to Melle, Husserl believed that commentators had wrongly associated his idea of ontology with Meinong's theory of objects, and that Wundt had put forward an unfounded interpretation and critique of the Logical Investigations. He added that when Husserl published Ideas, he dismayed followers who saw it as abandoning Husserl's earlier commitment to realism.

In “On the Task and Historical Position of the Logical Investigations”, Husserl sought to explain his use of the term "descriptive psychology". Husserl observed that while he considered the Logical Investigations a development of Brentano's ideas, Brentano himself never recognized them as such due to their "completely different method", whereas Dilthey reacted to them favorably, even though they were not indebted to his writings. According to Husserl, Dilthey saw the work as "a first concrete achievement of his (own) ideas about a descriptive and analytic psychology." Husserl emphasized differences between his "descriptive psychology" and the philosophical approaches of both Brentano and Dilthey. He maintained that despite his "imperfect" approach to consciousness, he had helped to show that consciousness is "an achievement that takes place in manifold verifiable forms and associated syntheses, overall pervasively intentional, goal-oriented, directed toward ideas of truth."

Influence
The Logical Investigations influenced the philosopher Martin Heidegger. Heidegger studied them while a student at the Collegium Borromaeum, a theological seminary in Freiburg, where they were so rarely requested from the university library that he was easily able to renew them. Heidegger was disappointed to find that they did not help to clarify the multiple meanings of being, but was nevertheless impressed by them and convinced to study philosophy as a result of reading them. Heidegger believed that the second volume marked an apparent revival of psychologism, which puzzled him. In Being and Time (1927), Heidegger credited the Logical Investigations with making the work possible, and noted their influence on the philosopher Emil Lask. Heidegger credited Lask with being the only person who had taken up Husserl's investigations "from outside the main stream of phenomenological research". Heidegger pointed to Lask's Die Logik der Philosophie und die Kategorienlehre (1911) and Die Lehre vom Urteil (1912).

The book influenced the philosopher Jean-Paul Sartre, who drew on its ideas in works such as The Transcendence of the Ego (1936) and Being and Nothingness (1943). The work also influenced the sociologist Talcott Parsons' The Structure of Social Action (1937), and the Prague linguistic circle, thereby helping to establish the form of structuralism represented by the French anthropologist Claude Lévi-Strauss. The work influenced the linguist Roman Jakobson, and helped shape the development of Waldemar Conrad's work on aesthetics and the philosopher Gustav Shpet's work on both aesthetics and the philosophy of language. It also influenced the philosopher Ernst Tugendhat's work Vorlesungen zur Einführung in die sprachanalytische Philosophie (1976). The Logical Investigations have been compared to the philosophy of mathematics of the Nicolas Bourbaki group. Though they did not influence the structural linguistics of Louis Hjelmslev and Noam Chomsky, their theories have nevertheless been compared to Husserl's inquiries. It has also been suggested that the Logical Investigations dealt with questions concerning the role of language similar to those discussed in the theologian Saint Augustine's Confessions.

Discussions in the European Journal of Philosophy
Discussions of the work in the European Journal of Philosophy include those by Gianfranco Soldati, Irene McMullin, and Lambert Zuidervaart.

Soldati criticized the laws Husserl formulated concerning "the relations between dependent and independent parts of a whole", finding them "incomplete and not always easy to grasp." He also noted that some commentators have seen Husserl as maintaining that formal ontology is independent of formal logic, while others believe that for Husserl, formal ontology belongs to formal logic. Mcmullin argued that while in the Logical Investigations, Husserl's discussion of "expression" was focused exclusively on its linguistic meaning, he developed a significantly expanded notion of expression in his later work.

Zuidervaart wrote that the Logical Investigations have been variously interpreted by Anglo-American commentators, being seen as idealist by the philosopher Louis Dupré and realist by the philosopher Dallas Willard, while others argue Husserl moved from realism to idealism. He added that there has been dispute over whether Husserl has "an epistemic conception of propositional truth" according to which propositional truth "depends on discursive justification to some significant degree". He concluded that Husserl suggests an alternative to "the epistemic/nonepistemic polarity in contemporary truth theory" and "a way to resituate propositional truth within a broader and more dynamic conception of truth".

Discussions in Human Studies
Discussions of the work in Human Studies include those by Mark Katherine Tillman and Keiichi Noé.

Tillman maintained that the "descriptive psychology of prepredicative thought" Husserl expounded in the Logical Investigations had been anticipated by both Dilthey and the theologian John Henry Newman, despite the fact that Newman, unlike Dilthey, never used the term. Noé argued that Husserl modified his views after the publication of the Logical Investigations, expressing a different perspective in his posthumous work The Origin of Geometry. He characterized these changes as "the Hermeneutic Tum" in the Husserlian phenomenology of language, suggesting that it was caused by "a change of attitude toward the constitutive function of language". He described Husserl's later view of language as "dialogical", in contrast to the "monological" view of the Logical Investigations.

Discussions in Inquiry
Discussions of the work in Inquiry include those by Wayne M. Martin and Lilian Alweiss. 

Martin defended Husserl against Dummett's argument that his attempt to extend an analysis of the structure of meaningful expressions into an account of the structure of meaning in experience is a form of psychologism and idealism. He attributed to Husserl the view that, "meanings are mind-independent structures that are also structures of consciousness", finding it controversial but defensible. He maintained that Husserl's later views on noemata were not a renunciation but a further development of those in the Logical Investigations, even though Husserl introduced the term "noema" only in Ideas. Alweiss argued that, contrary to a consensus among analytic philosophers, examination of the Logical Investigations shows that Husserl was not a "methodological solipsist". However, she considered it open to debate whether Husserl adopted a position of "internalism".

Discussions in Studia Phaenomenologica
Discussions of the work in Studia Phaenomenologica include those by Peter Andras Varga and Bernardo Ainbinder.

Varga discussed the philosopher Leonard Nelson's criticism of Husserl's arguments against psychologism in the Logical Investigations in Über das sogennante Erkenntnisproblem (1908), noting that Nelson charged Husserl with "mistaking deduction for proof" and thereby falsely assuming that a psychological foundation of logic would inevitably lead to a vicious circle. He argued that Nelson misunderstood and oversimplified Husserl's views and that his arguments against Husserl were flawed. He also noted that despite his criticism of Husserl, Nelson recognized some similarity between their views, suggesting that he made "a very fruitful comparison between his and Husserl’s enterprise". He suggested that Husserl also misunderstood Nelson, and that his phenomenology could benefit from Nelson's "presentation of the framework of the problem of the foundation."

Criticizing the view that Lask's interest in the work represented his departure from neo-Kantianism, Ainbinder argued that Lask found insights in it that could contribute to making sense of the "Kantian transcendental project" through a "proper understanding of the Copernican Turn in objectivistic terms"; according to Ainbinder, these included the "secondary place of judgment in the constitution of the categorial" and "the idea of a formal ontology". Ainbinder further argued that the work could be seen, despite Husserl's view of it, as "a proper work of transcendental philosophy", noting that Lask, like Heidegger, believed that Husserl overlooked its "key tools for transcendental thought", and as a result was led into "subjectivistic idealism". He added that Lask beliefs about how its approach needed to be complemented anticipated Husserl's later work.

Other discussions in academic journals
Other discussions of the Logical Investigations in academic journals include those by Dieter Münch in the Journal of the British Society for Phenomenology, the philosopher Dallas Willard in The Review of Metaphysics, Juan Jesús Borobia in Tópicos. Revista de Filosofía, John Scanlon in the Journal of Phenomenological Psychology, John J. Drummond in the International Journal of Philosophical Studies, Victor Biceaga in the Journal of the History of the Behavioral Sciences, Richard Tieszen in Philosophia Mathematica, Mariano Crespo in Revista de Filosofía, Juan Sebastián Ballén Rodríguez in Universitas Philosophica, Witold Płotka in Coactivity / Santalka, Manuel Gustavo Isaac in History & Philosophy of Logic, Mikhail A. Belousov in Russian Studies in Philosophy, Victor Madalosso and Yuri José in Intuitio, Findlay in The Philosophical Forum, and Andrea Marchesi in Grazer Philosophische Studien. Sávio Passafaro Peres has discussed the work in Estudos e Pesquisas em Psicologia and Psicologia USP.

Münch described the Logical Investigations as a "highly theoretical book", finding it similar in this respect to the Critique of Pure Reason. He maintained that Husserl's development of a theory of "symbolic knowledge" in the Logical Investigations showed that such a theory had been a significant problem for the early Husserl. He also argued that Husserl put forward a theory of truth in the work that represented a departure from that of his early writings, and that Husserl anticipated both aspects of artificial intelligence and criticisms of artificial intelligence made by philosophers such as John Searle and Hubert Dreyfus. He rejected the view that the Logical Investigations can be understood only from the perspective of Husserl's later work, in which he developed transcendental phenomenology.

Scanlon noted that Husserl visited Dilthey in 1905, after hearing favorable comments on his seminar on the Logical Investigations, and that Dilthey had publicly stated that the book was "epoch-making in the use of description for the theory of knowledge." According to Scanlon, although Husserl's critique of psychologism was widely considered devastating, he caused confusion by using the terms "phenomenology" and "descriptive psychology" interchangeably, leading some to conclude that he was presenting a new version of psychologism. He suggested that this may have embarrassed Husserl, who later explained that phenomenology could be described as "descriptive psychology" only in a properly qualified sense; he also argued that, despite some similarities, Husserl's views as expressed in the Logical Investigations were in other respects radically different from Dilthey's. He wrote that by 1925 Husserl had developed a more satisfying perspective on the issues discussed in the work, including recognition that numbers are formed actively in counting and propositions in judging, the "kernel of truth in psychologism". He credited Husserl with introducing a "rich and insightful approach to psychic life" in the Logical Investigations.

Drummond maintained that Husserl's theory of "pure logical grammar" occupied an intermediary position between his earlier and more mature theories of meaning, and that later parts of the Logical Investigations indicated that the theory of meaning in earlier parts of the work required correction. He added that Husserl indicated, in the second edition of the work, that it required extensive revision. According to Drummond, Husserl wrote a partial and preliminary revision, including "a new distinction between signitive and significative intentions", and "the claim that all meaning-conferring acts, including nominal acts, and all meaning-fulfilling acts, including those fulfilling nominal acts, are categorially formed." He argued that the first edition of the work suffered from Husserl's "early conception of phenomenology as descriptive psychology", which resulted in "a misconception
of the proper object of philosophical reflection" and a flawed account of expressive acts, and that Husserl used arguments that left him vulnerable to the charge that his views were a form of psychologism. However, he added that, in works such as Ideas, Husserl reformulated "the distinction between phenomenological and intentional contents" and developed an improved understanding of "the proper object of philosophical reflection". This change of view was also expressed in the second edition of the Logical Investigations.

Płotka argued that Husserl's program of objective investigation could be reformulated in a way that made it possible to understand phenomenology as "therapeutic science", involving "the methodological movement of the possibility for communal formulation of transcendental investigation."

Belousov questioned the details of Husserl's understanding of intentionality, noting that Husserl came to different conclusions in later works such as Ideas. Madalosso and José argued that the book contained "various conceptual and terminological problems", including that of how "a psychic act, ideal meaning and real object achieves to establish a correspondence relation".

Findlay argued that in Ideas, Husserl attempted to disguise changes that had occurred in his opinions by attributing his views as of 1913 to the earlier Logical Investigations. Marchesi argued that while it is widely accepted that "Husserl developed his most sophisticated theory of intentionality" in the Logical Investigations, it had incorrectly been interpreted as non-relational by most commentators. He maintained that a phenomenological theory of intentionality based on Husserl's insights cannot be non-relational.

In Estudos e Pesquisas em Psicologia, Peres observed that Husserl's phenomenology was "received as a form of descriptive psychology" that aimed at "conceptual preparation for the development of an empirical psychology." In Psicologia USP, he argued that Husserl understood phenomenology as a "peculiar form of descriptive psychology". He contrasted it with the classical empiricism of the 16th and 17th centuries and Kant's transcendental idealism.

Other evaluations
The philosopher Jacques Derrida, who studied the Logical Investigations as a student in the 1950s, offered a critique of Husserl's work in Speech and Phenomena (1967). Adorno maintained that the second volume of the Logical Investigations was "ambiguous". The philosopher Karl Popper commented that the Logical Investigations started a "vogue" for "anti-psychologism". He attributed Husserl's opposition to psychologism to the philosopher Gottlob Frege's criticism of the Philosophy of Arithmetic. He believed that Husserl, in his discussion of science, proposed distinctions similar to Popper's three worlds. However, he suggested that Husserl had written in a way that had caused confusion about his views. He also criticized Husserl's view that a scientific theory is an hypothesis that has been proven correct. The philosopher Paul Ricœur credited Husserl, along with Frege, with helping to establish the dichotomy "between Sinn or sense and Vorstellung or representation". Helmut R. Wagner described the Logical Investigations as Husserl's first major work. The philosopher Roger Scruton has criticized the Logical Investigations for their obscurity; however, he has also described them as being of "great interest", and noted that, alongside Ideas for a Pure Phenomenology (1913) and Cartesian Meditations (1929), they were among the writings by Husserl that had attracted the most attention.

The philosophers Barry Smith and David Woodruff Smith described the Logical Investigations as Husserl's magnum opus. They credited Husserl with providing a "devastating" critique of psychologism, adding that it was more influential than similar critiques from other philosophers such as Frege and Bernard Bolzano, and brought to an end the period during which psychologism was most influential. They noted that following the publication of the Logical Investigations, Husserl's interests shifted from logic and ontology to transcendental idealism and the methodology of phenomenology. According to Smith and Smith, Husserl's initial influence began at the University of Munich, where Johannes Daubert, who read the Logical Investigations in 1902, persuaded a group of students to accept the work and reject the views of their teacher Theodor Lipps. The philosopher Judith Butler compared the Logical Investigations to the early work of the philosopher Ludwig Wittgenstein.

Donn Welton stated that in the Logical Investigations, Husserl introduced a novel conception of the relationships between language and experience, meaning and reference, and subject and object, and by his work on theories dealing with meaning, truth, the subject, and the object, helped create phenomenology, a new form of philosophy that went beyond psychologism, formalism, realism, idealism, objectivism and subjectivism, and made twentieth century continental philosophy possible. Moran wrote that the Logical Investigations exerted an influence on 20th-century European philosophy comparable to that which Sigmund Freud's The Interpretation of Dreams (1899) had exerted on psychoanalysis.  Powell described the analyses of signs and meaning in the Logical Investigations as "rigorous and abstract", "scrupulous", but also "tedious".

The philosopher Ray Monk described the Logical Investigations as obscurely written, adding that the philosopher Bertrand Russell reported finding reading it difficult. The philosopher Robert Sokolowski credited Husserl with providing a convincing critique of psychologism. However, he criticized the first edition of the Logical Investigations for sharply distinguishing between "the thing as given to us" and the thing-in-itself, a standpoint he considered comparable to Kant's. He noted that between 1900 and 1910, Husserl abandoned these Kantian distinctions. According to Sokolowski, when Husserl expressed a new philosophical position in Ideas, he was misinterpreted as adopting a traditional form of idealism and "many thinkers who admired Husserl's earlier work distanced themselves from what he now taught."

See also
 Formal ontology
 Theory of moments

References

Bibliography
Books

 
 
 
 
 
 
 
 
 
 
 
 
 
 
 
 
 
 
 
 
 

Journals

  
 
 
  
  
  
  
  
 
  
  
  
 
  
 
 
  
  
 
  
  
  
  
  
  
  
  
  
  
  
  
  
  

Online articles

External links
 Logische Untersuchungen: Erster Theil – original text in German at archive.org
 Logische Untersuchungen: Zweiter Theil – original text in German at archive.org

1900 non-fiction books
1901 non-fiction books
1900 essays
1901 essays
Books by Edmund Husserl
German non-fiction books
Logic literature
Phenomenology literature
Philosophy of mathematics literature